Farida may refer to:

 Farida (given name)
 Farida Force, an ad hoc Australian Army unit formed in World War II
 Farida Group, a leather manufacturing company in Chennai, India
 Farida Guitars, a Chinese musical instrument manufacturer